The Late B.P. Helium is the solo recording project and, at times, stage name of Elephant Six musician Bryan Poole, who also goes by Bryan Helium.

Poole has spent much of his musical career playing bass  and guitar on and off with of Montreal and Elf Power since the mid-1990s. He was also a member of the XTC cover band Helium Kids (a.k.a. The Mummers) from 1994 to 1995.  In 2001, he released a few singles and submitted tracks to various compilations before offering his first EP, Kumquat Mae, on his 2002 tour with The Visitations.  It was later re-released on Orange Twin Records in 2003, and allowed him to work on his solo debut album, Amok, which was also released on Orange Twin in 2004.

Discography

Albums
 Amok (CD) – Orange Twin – 2004

Singles and EPs
 Happy Happy Birthday to Me Singles Club: August (7") – HHBTM – 2001 
 Split single with Of Montreal (7") – Jonathan Whiskey – 2001 
 Kumquat Mae (CD) – Hype City Records/Orange Twin – 2002

References

External links
Official Late B.P. Helium Site

The Elephant 6 Recording Company artists
Indie rock musical groups from Georgia (U.S. state)
Of Montreal members